Jaroslav Jeřábek (born 2 April 1971) is a Slovak former cyclist. He competed for Czechoslovakia at the 1992 Summer Olympics and for Slovakia at the 2000 Summer Olympics and the 2004 Summer Olympics.

References

1971 births
Living people
Slovak male cyclists
Olympic cyclists of Czechoslovakia
Olympic cyclists of Slovakia
Cyclists at the 1992 Summer Olympics
Cyclists at the 2000 Summer Olympics
Cyclists at the 2004 Summer Olympics
People from Louny